JoJo's Circus is a stop-motion animated television series created by Jim Jinkins, David Campbell, Lisa Jinkins, and Eric Weiner and produced by the Canada-based Cuppa Coffee Studios and Cartoon Pizza. The series was written by Douglas Wood, the creative executive for two of 1990s animated series: Tiny Toon Adventures and Animaniacs. Features songs with music by Jeffrey Zahn and Jim Latham and lyrics done by Judy Rothman. The theme song was performed by BECKY.

It was first aired on the Disney Channel as part of the Playhouse Disney lineup from September 28, 2003, to February 14, 2007 (last episode's airdate) with reruns until 2008. JoJo's Circus marks the first stop-motion series done by Jinkins himself.

Plot
The series that takes place in a fantasy Circus Town, a self-sufficient city whose cultural center is the "Big Top" tent. The story centers on JoJo Tickle, a silly 6-year-old active girl clown, and Goliath, JoJo's pet lion. She and Goliath learned at the Little Big Top Circus School, where all young soon-to-be circus performers learn under their teacher Mrs. Kersplatski. Alongside her friends, JoJo discovers and learns while dealing with challenging situations.

Recurring themes
JoJo's Circus depends on repetition in its structure. Each segment always begins with JoJo searching for Goliath, who is always hiding. JoJo then is introduced with the situation that will occupy the theme of the show. A song, usually about the resolution of the situation, is then performed by JoJo.

At the conclusion of each episode, a supporting character asks, "What did you learn today, JoJo?", and before she can reply, JoJo is taken away for the last segment, the "spotlight moment". JoJo is then placed on a makeshift stage with various cameramen, lighting grips, and producers running about, while the "Spotlight Moment" song plays, asking what she's learned, is sung and JoJo taps her foot along (in some episodes she also taps her hand on her leg). Subsequently, JoJo says what she has learned in the course of the episode.

Characters
The show's voice directors are Kent Meridith (United States) and Debra Toffan (Canada).

Main
 JoJo Tickle (voiced by Madeleine Martin) is a silly 6-year-old active girl clown whose parents are famous circus clowns. She's kind-hearted, has a great sense of humor, boundless curiosity, and excitement about life.
 Goliath (voiced by Robert Norman Smith and Alan Ford) is JoJo's pet lion who attends school just like JoJo. He's also part of the Tickle family. Because of his playfulness, he hides from JoJo in the beginning of each episode. He is JoJo's best friend.
 Skeebo Seltzer/Funnyshoes (voiced by Austin Di Iulio in Season 1 and Keeler Sandhaus in Seasons 2–3) is a class cowboy clown who wears a floppy cowboy hat, a star badge on his vest, and purple rectangle glasses and is JoJo's best friend, just like Goliath, and attends school with her and the other circus kids. Skeebo's eager to make people laugh by making new jokes, slight gags, and tricks that sometimes fail to work. Since "Skeebo's Pet," he has a pet dog named Harpo.
 Croaky Frogini (voiced by Diana Peressini) is the great leaper of the group, met JoJo on the first day of school when she realized she had different abilities and agreed to help each other learn different tricks.
 Trina Tightrope (voiced by Tajja Isen) is a ballet dancing, tightrope walker. She comes across as abrupt and snobbish on some reason, but apologizes for her mistakes when she becomes aware of them. She has a pet cat named Caterina. Her most notable appearances are in the episodes "JoJo on the Tightrope" and "Trina Trips Up".
 Mr. Tickle (voiced by David Sparrow in Season 1 and Noah Weisberg in Seasons 2–3) is JoJo's father, Peaches' husband, Lotta Yucks' grandson-in-law, Granny and Grampy's son-in-law and Uncle Flippy's brother-in-law. He is a jolly clown who often blasts off to work as a living cannonball and whose first name is never mentioned.
 Peaches Tickle (voiced by Marnie McPhail in Seasons 1–2 and Shannon Perreault in Season 3) is JoJo's mother, Mr. Tickle's wife, Lotta Yucks' granddaughter, Granny and Grampy's daughter and Uncle Flippy's sister. She is a tall, skinny clown who is full of sunshine and often makes goodies for her family and Circus Town residents. She is a klutzy ilk, but a good juggler and sometimes catches 15 objects in the air when she accidentally trips.
 Mrs. Karen Kersplatski (voiced by Jayne Eastwood) is JoJo's teacher and the big top ringmaster. A warm and encouraging teacher with glasses, Mrs. Kersplatski gives the circus kids a strong sense of mastery and confidence, with her combination of hard work and play. In the second season, she married Mr. Muscles and became Maya's stepmother. She is very clumsy and after she trips, her catchphrase is "I'm okay!"

Supporting
 Dinky Pachyderm (voiced by Julie Lemieux) is a sweet and frisky baby elephant. While Dinky may be clumsy and somewhat foolish, when he dances, he turns into "Mr. Graceful." His favorite game is "Hide and Seek".
 Tater Spudinski (voiced by Cole Caplan) is one of the two kids in the Spudinski group. His sleepy potato kind seems to be the antithesis to the "get up and go" feel of the show, but sometimes he can't help but join in the fun. In the second season, he has a younger sister named Small Fry.
 Bal Boa (voiced by Julie Lemieux) is a sneaky contortionist snake with a talent for making number and letter shapes. Bal Boa also has a knack for troublemaking. He thinks it's fun to tease JoJo and others into doing what they are not supposed to do, and the kids are sometimes susceptible to Bal Boa's charms. Bal Boa is also an expert on harvesting squirting flowers by doing a trance dance.
 Fellini (voiced by Neil Crone) and Federico Frogini (voiced by John Stocker) are the two Italian-accented brothers are expert jumpers and trapeze artists. Fellini and Federico are uncle and father, respectively, to Croaky. (Note in the first episode of the series "Take a Bow" the closed captioning stated that they had a Russian accent). They are also called the Flying Froginis.
 Mr. Aldeberto Muscles (voiced by Mark Consuelos in Season 1 and  Erik Estrada in Seasons 2–3) is the circus strongman and a physical education instructor. He knows a lot of exercises that he teaches to those in Circus Town. He has a daughter named Maya and recently married Mrs. Kersplatski, but it's not known whether he was divorced or widowed. He is in dual language and also speaks in both English and Spanish.
 Maya Muscles (voiced by Phoebe McAuley) is the daughter of Mr. Muscles and stepdaughter of Mrs. Kersplatski. She's fairly new to both Circus Town and JoJo's class. She has red hair, wears a tiara with a pair of antennae on them, and can be shy at times but loves to get up and go. She is known by her nickname "Little Mouse" by her dad and her favorite "Happy Place" is a Daisy Patch.

Other
 Dr. Seltzer/Funnyshoes (voiced by Kathy Greenwood) is Skeebo's mother. She is Circus Town's only doctor and Fire Chief Seltzer's wife. Though she's not in many episodes and makes cameos in some episodes, her most notable appearances are in the episodes, "A Serious Case of the Sillies", and "Tickled Pink."
 Fire Chief Seltzer/Chief Funnyshoes (also known as Seltzy) (voiced by Patrick McKenna) is Skeebo's father. He is the chief of the local fire department in Circus Town and Dr. Seltzer's husband. He is also the director of the Circus Town Clown Band.
 Mr. (voiced by Bruce Bayley Johnson) and Mrs. Spudinski (voiced by Julie Lemieux) are Tater's parents, who have the same sleepy nature as he does. It's revealed in "The Thanksgiving Hip-Hooray Parade" episode that Tater calls his father "Daddy Spud", and in "Circus Town Makeover" Mrs. Spudinski's name is revealed as Ida and Mr. Spudinski's name is revealed as Russ.
 Small Fry Spudinski (voiced by Julie Lemieux) is Tater's baby sister and one of the two children in the Spudinski clan. She first appeared in the episode, "Hi There, Small Fry!", and she also appeared again in another episode, "Circus Town Makeover".
 Mrs. Pachyderm (voiced by Judy Marshak) is Dinky's mother. She has also been referred to as Mrs. Elephant.
 Babalulu (voiced by Kathy Brier) is Circus Town's pretzel vendor and ice cream shop owner. JoJo and her friends sometimes visits her at the ice cream parlor for a treat. JoJo and her friends taught Babalulu how to make pretzel twists in the episode "A New Twist."
 Lotta Yucks is JoJo's great-grandmother, Peaches' grandmother, Mr. Tickle's grandmother-in-law, Granny's mother and Grampy's mother-in-law. She was a famous circus performer doing tightrope and comical pratfall acts.
 Jumberto (voiced by Jonathan Potts) is a jackrabbit magician whose tricks rarely work.
 Jig, Jag, and Jug are the three nephews of Jumberto who always cause mischief.
 Terrific (voiced by Ed Saheley) is a famous tiger tamer in Circus Town. He has a tiger named Tippoo.
 Uncle Flippy (voiced by Tony Daniels) is a farmer and JoJo's maternal uncle. Uncle Flippy owns a farm on the outskirts of Circus Town. On the episode entitled "Uncle Flippy's Funny Farm," JoJo and her classmates help Uncle Flippy round up all the animals who escaped from the barn. Strangely, he has a pet tiger and two horses named Moe (who acts in a proper manner) and Costello (who always loves to act silly). He is Peaches' brother, Mr. Tickle's brother-in-law, Granny and Grampy's son.
 Super Duper Girl is JoJo's favorite TV superhero clown whose motto is: "Morning, Noon or Night I Always Do What's Right!" while fighting "Big Meanies" who "Pick on" others.
 Baloney Balloony (voiced by Darren Frost) is known for making balloon animals. Baloney Balloony can make any animal-shaped balloons with his hands. He has a grandson named Bailey.
 Cotton Andy (voiced by Paul Soles) is a cotton candy vendor who own a cotton candy machine named "Whoopsabelle" and also officiated as Justice of the Peace for the marriage of Mrs. Kersplatski and Mr. Muscles in the wedding episode "A Circus Town Wedding."
 Bingo Bongo is a world's greatest traveling clown who travels via hot air balloon.
 Charlie the Clown Baby is one of JoJo's cousins who the Tickles sometimes babysit. He is the son of Peaches' sister.
 Grampy Tickle (voiced by Keith Knight), Young Grampy Tully (voiced by Joshua Isen) and Granny Tickle (voiced by Kate Gallant) are JoJo's maternal grandparents, Peaches' parents, Mr. Tickle's parents-in-law, Lotta Yucks' son-in-law and daughter. Tully and Sadie Tickle were experts on clowning way before JoJo was born. Their famous act is the "Silly Shoe Shuffle," in which Granny Tickle passed the act to both JoJo and Goliath.
 Terra Cotta (voiced by Kristen Bone) is the young clown girl who wears an oversize flower pot for a hat, and she bought JoJo's silly skates in the "Too Many Toys" episode.
 Mrs. Cotta is Terra Cotta's mom who wears a planter for a hat.
 Mr. Postman is an octopus/polyp who is the Mail Carrier for Circus Town.
 Mrs. Boa is Bal Boa's mother.
 Hogan the Hamster is one of the class pets who live at the Little Big Top Clown School.
 Cha Cha the Clown Crab is one of the class pets from the Little Big Top Clown School who JoJo takes care of for the night.
 The Fire Clowns are the firefighting crew at the Circus Town firehouse under the command of Fire Chief Seltzer (Number 2 is a female clown who wears a purple hat wears a pink vest, brown belt with gray boots; and Number 3 is a small clown with large eyeglasses, yellow and purple hat with blue and pink vest with orange buttons, wearing brown belt with tools with gray boots) who carry JoJo off at the end of each episode and help build the makeshift stage for JoJo's "spotlight moment". They're also the resident orchestra for Circus Town's Big Top.
 King Regis (Aiden Turner) and Queen Regina: JoJo's Royal Uncle (and brother of Mr. Tickle) and Aunt from Really Royal Land who are the Parents of Princess Josephina.
 Princess Josephina (voiced by Tajja Isen) is JoJo's similar-looking royal cousin who lives in Really Royal Land. She has a pet lion named Hercules who looks just like Goliath. She appeared in the episode "Princess for a Day," where she and JoJo decide that it would be fun to trade places.
 Jibby Jabby-Jamboree (also known as Jibbs) is the butler who serves the Royal Family of Really Royal Land.
 Miss Blathers is Princess Josephina's personal tutor on etiquette.
 Bailey Balloon (voiced by Matthew Josten) is Baloney Ballooney's grandson. Bailey Ballooney normally attends Small Top Hills School and only visited JoJo's class on Valentine's Day. JoJo comes up with a special way to make him a valentine in the episode "My Clowny Valentine."
 Mr. Jing-a-Ling is the telephone at Fire Chief Seltzer's firehouse where Fire Chief Selzer receives their emergency calls.
 Waldo is a baby seal who suffered from memory loss who JoJo helps to remember a musical piece before a major performance.
 Ivan is a famous circus bear from Circusylvania who only speaks Circusylvanian.
 Franco the Fantastic is a lion who is known as "The King of the Jungle" and "The Greatest Circus Lion of All Times".
 Alex is Skeebo's cousin who is deaf and speaks in sign language.
 Mr. and Mrs. Tightrope are Trina's parents who are slightly uppity and snooty but very loving and kind.
 T.J. Freckles/ T.J. Hiccups is Skeebo's Ventriloquist puppet in which Skeebo uses in his act.
 Dr. Longtall is the veterinarian who takes care of Goliath and the other sick animals at Circus Town.
 Miss Spritzy is the hairstylist who works at the Circus Town Hair Salon.
 Chico the Mouse is the ringmaster of the Mouse Circus.
 Grasshopper the Magnificent is the tightrope walker of the Mouse Circus.
 Sasharoo is the wild animal trainer in the Mouse Circus who trains with a chipmunk.
 Professor Tick Tock is the watcher of the cuckoos of the Cuckoo Forest and provider of the cuckoo clocks for Circus Town.
 The Cricketeers (Hector, Gracie, and Cody) are a musical group formed of a family of crickets who comes to perform at Circus Town. Hector is the leader and his wife is Gracie and his son is Cody. Goliath has a crush with Gracie.
 Nosey Josie is the reporter for the Circus Town News Network who has a nose for news.
 Jumping Jack is the host of Circus Town Makeover and exercise/fitness guru.
 The citizens of Sky Top are the villagers who live in the village of Sky Top who at once thought that Normus the Giant was a mean giant who once destroyed their village but discovered that Normus was very friendly.
 Normus (voiced by Al Roker) is a friendly giant who live on top of the beanstalk who due to a misunderstanding by the townsfolk of the beanstalk village of Sky Top thought he was a mean giant who almost destroyed the town and had a slight fear of clowns.
 Cozy is Normus's pet chipmunk.

Development and concept
The show emphasizes simple, everyday lessons such as playing with others, detecting the sequence, personal hygiene, responsibility, and safety. Also, foremost is the show's emphasis on exercise: JoJo often asks for audience participation (such as clapping, jumping, and stretching) for the viewers. The series is animated in claymation, which is a serious departure to Jinkin's past animated works.

Characters JoJo and her pet lion, Goliath, returned in a yoga-style exercise learning series/interstitial called Feeling Good with JoJo.

Episodes

Series overview

Season 1 (2003–04)

Season 2 (2004–06)

Season 3 (2006–07)

Feeling Good with JoJo 
Feeling Good with JoJo is a series of five-minute shorts that were a spin-off of JoJo's Circus. The series was about JoJo Tickle and her pet lion Goliath. In each episode JoJo and Goliath went on an adventure around the circus, and teach the viewers yoga lessons for the TV viewers. Sometimes one of the show's characters were involved. JoJo's main goal was to help each character in every episode, with a yoga stretching lesson. At the beginning of the series, Jojo would stand in front of the stage, spin around and magically have her hair tied up in a bun while wearing a yellow shirt with a clown on it.  The shorts run from February 24, 2006, to May 16, 2008, spanning 2 seasons 20 episodes.

Episodes 

 Snakes
 Bears
 Windshield Wipers
 Reach for the Sun Stretch
 Clown Shoe Stretch

References

External links
 
 

2000s preschool education television series
2000s American animated television series
2003 American television series debuts
2006 American television series debuts
2007 American television series endings
2008 American television series endings
2000s Canadian animated television series
2003 Canadian television series debuts
2006 Canadian television series debuts
2007 Canadian television series endings
2008 Canadian television series endings
American children's animated comedy television series
American children's animated fantasy television series
American children's animated musical television series
American preschool education television series
Canadian children's animated comedy television series
Canadian children's animated fantasy television series
Canadian children's animated musical television series
Canadian preschool education television series
English-language television shows
Disney Junior original programming
Animated television series about children
Animated television series about lions
American stop-motion animated television series
Canadian stop-motion animated television series
Television series by Disney
Television series by Cuppa Coffee Studios
Disney animated television series
Circus television shows
Television series created by Jim Jinkins
Television shows about clowns
Animated preschool education television series
American surreal comedy television series